The 2019–20 Azerbaijan Basketball League, is the 27th season of the top professional basketball league in Azerbaijan.

Teams
Eight teams joined the competition. Only 80ies repeated presence from the previous season.

Competition format
The eight clubs played a four-legged round robin tournament where the four first qualified teams would advance to the playoffs. The league started on 10 October 2019.

Regular season

League table

Results

Playoffs
The semi-finals were played in a best-of-three playoff format and the finals in a best-of-five playoff format (1-1-1-1-1).

Bracket

Semi-finals

|}

Finals

|}

Third place series

|}

References

External links
Azerbaijani Basketball Federation website
Azeri league at Eurobasket.com

Azerbaijan
Basketball
Basketball
Basketball in Azerbaijan